Libín is a municipality and village in České Budějovice District in the South Bohemian Region of the Czech Republic. It has about 400 inhabitants.

Administrative parts
Villages of Slavošovice and Spolí are administrative parts of Libín.

References

Villages in České Budějovice District